Extended Noise (established 1982) was a Norwegian Jazz Quintet. Their first album Keep nose in front (1984) under the name AHA was released after an acclaimed appearance at Moldejazz 1983, followed by the Extended nose album Jamaha (1986) where Alnes was substituted for Klakegg. The change of name was dued to the competition from the Norwegian pop band "a-ha". The last record was Slow but Sudden – Langsam, aber Plötzlich (Odin Records, 1990), in the US on Cadence Jazz Records 1992), now as Extended Noise as a Quartet without guitars and with compositions by One Pedersen for the most.

Band members  
Erik Balke - saksofon
Eivin One Pedersen - piano, celeste and harmonium
Carl Morten Iversen - bass
Audun Kleive - drums

Additional members  
Frode Alnæs - guitar
Bjørn Klakegg - guitar

Discography 
Keep nose in front (Hot Club Records, 1984), as "AHA"
Jamaha (Circulasione Totale, 1986)
Slow but Sudden – Langsam, aber Plötzlich (Odin Records, 1990)

References

External links 
 Slow But Sudden - Langsam, Aber Plötzlich - Extended Noise

Norwegian jazz ensembles
Norwegian experimental musical groups
Musical groups established in 1982
Musical groups from Oslo
Odin Records artists
Hot Club Records artists
1982 establishments in Norway